Sadık Altıncan  (1898–1963) was a Turkish navy officer and statesman, who was a prominent figure in the transition to a multiparty system.

References 

1898 births
1963 deaths
Turkish admirals
Military personnel from Istanbul
Republican People's Party (Turkey) politicians
20th-century Turkish politicians
Politicians from Istanbul